The 2014 Gator Bowl was an American college football bowl game that was played on January 1, 2014 at EverBank Field in Jacksonville, Florida. The 69th edition of the Gator Bowl, it featured the Nebraska Cornhuskers from the Big Ten Conference against the Georgia Bulldogs from the Southeastern Conference.  The game began at 12:00 noon EST and aired on ESPN2.  It was one of the 2013–14 bowl games that concluded the 2013 FBS football season.  The game was sponsored by tax preparation software company TaxSlayer.com and was officially known as the TaxSlayer.com Gator Bowl.

Nebraska finished their season with a record of 8–4 (5–3 Big Ten), tied for second place in the Big Ten Legends Division. Georgia had a regular season record of 8–4 (5–3 SEC).  They finished in third place in the Southeastern Conference Eastern Division, and were ranked #22 in the BCS.

Nebraska beat Georgia by a score of 24–19. Nebraska wide receiver Quincy Enunwa, who had 4 receptions for 129 yards, including a 99-yard touchdown reception, was named the game's most valuable player.

Teams

The 2014 Gator Bowl marked the third time Nebraska and Georgia have played each other. Georgia won the last meeting 45-31 in the 2013 Capital One Bowl. The series was tied 1-1 coming into the game.

Nebraska

Nebraska entered the game with an 8-4 (5-3 conference) record. The Cornhuskers began the season ranked #18 in the AP Poll. Nebraska began the season with a 5-1 record, but went 3-3 in the second half of the season to finish third in the Legends Division. In addition, senior quarterback Taylor Martinez was injured in the season opener, and was limited to only four games in 2013. With Martinez's injury, Tommy Armstrong Jr. and Ron Kellogg III took over quarterback duties. After the Cornhuskers lost to Iowa 17-38 in the Heroes Game, there was speculation that coach Bo Pelini would be fired. However, Nebraska athletic director Shawn Eichorst released a statement saying that Pelini will remain Nebraska's coach.

The 2014 edition of the Gator Bowl marked Nebraska's second appearance in the game. The Cornhuskers won their previous appearance in 2009 in a 26-21 victory over Clemson. The 2014 Gator Bowl also marked Nebraska's 50th bowl game appearance.

Georgia

Georgia entered the game with an 8-4 (5-3 conference) record. The Bulldogs began the season ranked #5 in the AP Poll and were picked by SEC media to be winners of the SEC East division. After losing its opener to Clemson, the Bulldogs would win their next four games, which included victories over #6 LSU and #6 South Carolina, to move to a 4-1 record on the season. However, the injury ridden Bulldogs would go 4-3 the rest of the season, with losses to Missouri, Vanderbilt and eventual SEC champions Auburn in the Prayer at Jordan–Hare. The Bulldogs finished third in the SEC East division. In addition, quarterback Aaron Murray suffered a season-ending injury in a game against Kentucky. Murray had passed for 13,166 yards and 121 touchdowns, and had started 52 straight games prior to his injury. Hutson Mason took over quarterback duties following Murray's injury and was the starting quarterback for Georgia in the 2014 Gator Bowl.

The 2014 edition of the Gator Bowl marked the fourth appearance by Georgia in the game. The Bulldogs won their previous Gator Bowl appearance in 1989 in a 34-27 victory over Michigan State.

Game summary

First half
The first quarter of the game was scoreless, as all the drives in the quarter ended in punts. In the second quarter, the Bulldogs drove to Nebraska's 10-yard line. However, Georgia was unable to reach the endzone and settled for a 39-yard field goal to give the Bulldogs a 3-0 lead. The Bulldogs' defense then forced the Cornhuskers to punt after Nebraska was unable to get a first down. Georgia muffed the ensuing punt, and Nebraska was able to recover the punt at Georgia's 14-yard line. Taking advantage of the turnover, the Cornhuskers took a 7-3 lead on a 5-yard touchdown pass from Tommy Armstrong Jr. to Quincy Enunwa. On the ensuing Bulldogs drive, Georgia once again drove deep into Nebraska territory, but this time were stopped at Nebraska's 11-yard line. Georgia placekicker Marshall Morgan kicked a 28-yard field goal to make it a 7-6 game. On the next drive, Nebraska took a 10-6 lead on a 46-yard field goal from Pat Smith. The Bulldogs responded on its next drive with a 38-yard field goal from Marshall Morgan as time expired in the first half to make it a 10-9 game.

Second half
Georgia's opening drive of the second half was ended when Hutson Mason was intercepted by Josh Mitchell at Georgia's 42-yard line. Taking advantage of the turnover, Nebraska extended their lead to 17–9 on a 1-yard touchdown run by Ameer Abdullah. On the following Georgia drive, the Bulldogs once again drove deep into Nebraska territory. However, Georgia was once again forced to settle for a field goal, closing the gap to 17–12. The ensuing Nebraska drive started at the Cornhuskers' 5-yard line, after Nebraska committed a holding penalty on the kickoff. On a second and 6 play at Nebraska's 9-yard line, quarterback Tommy Armstrong Jr. fumbled the snap and was sacked at Nebraska's 1-yard line. Facing a third and 14 situation, Armstrong connected with Quincy Enunwa on a 99-yard touchdown pass to take a 24–12 lead with 4:58 remaining in the third quarter. After forcing the Bulldogs to punt, Nebraska once again received the ball with 3:21 remaining in the third quarter. On the third play of the drive, however, Armstrong's pass was intercepted by Shaq Wiggins at Nebraska's 39-yard line with 2:03 remaining in the third quarter.

On the first play of the fourth quarter, Georgia scored its first touchdown of the game on a 25-yard touchdown pass from Hutson Mason to Todd Gurley to make it a 24–19 game. Georgia's defense then stepped up, forcing the next two Nebraska drives to end in punts. Starting at their own 20-yard line with 7:31 remaining in the game, the Bulldogs once again drove deep into Nebraska territory. Facing a fourth down and 2 situation at Nebraska's 14-yard line, Georgia elected to go for it instead of kicking the field goal. The Bulldogs were unable to convert, however, when wide receiver Rantavious Wooten dropped what would have been a first-down pass. After forcing the Cornhuskers to punt, Georgia once again drove deep into Nebraska's territory. With 31 seconds remaining in the game, the Bulldogs needed to convert a fourth and 3 situation at Nebraska's 16-yard line. Georgia failed to convert, however, when tight end Arthur Lynch dropped a pass from Mason. With 25 seconds remaining in the game, Nebraska ran the clock out to seal the victory.

Scoring summary

Statistics

Nebraska wide receiver Quincy Enunwa was named the game's most valuable player. Enunwa had 4 receptions for 129 yards and 2 touchdowns. Enunwa's 99-yard touchdown reception in the third quarter also set the record for longest pass play in bowl history.

Georgia outgained Nebraska 416-307 in total yards. The Bulldogs outgained the Cornhuskers 320–163 in passing yards, while the Cornhuskers outgained the Bulldogs 144–96 in rushing yards. The Bulldogs also made seven trips inside of Nebraska's 21-yard line.

Nebraska's leading rusher was Ameer Abdullah, who rushed for 122 yards on 27 carries. Quarterback Tommy Armstrong Jr. completed 6 of his 14 passes for 2 touchdowns and 1 interception. Armstrong was also the Cornhuskers' second-leading rusher, rushing for 26 yards on 10 carries.

Georgia's leading rusher was Todd Gurley, who rushed for 86 yards on 21 carries. Gurley was also the Bulldogs' leading receiver, catching 7 passes for 97 yards and 1 touchdown. Arthur Lynch was Georgia's second leading receiver, catching 6 passes for 69 yards. Quarterback Hutson Mason completed 21 of his 39 passes for 1 touchdown and 1 interception.

References

Gator Bowl
Gator Bowl
Nebraska Cornhuskers football bowl games
Georgia Bulldogs football bowl games
Gator Bowl
Gator Bowl
21st century in Jacksonville, Florida